Joseph James Kurth (January 23, 1907 – January 6, 1987) was an American football tackle for the Green Bay Packers of the National Football League (NFL). He played college football for Wisconsin and Notre Dame where he was named as an All-American in 1932.

Early life and college career
Kurth was born on January 23, 1907, in Waunakee, Wisconsin. He attended Madison East High School in Madison, Wisconsin. 

He played college football for Wisconsin and Notre Dame. While at Notre Dame in 1932 he was named as an All-American.

Professional career
Following his All-American campaign in 1932 he signed with the Green Bay Packers of the National Football League (NFL). In two years with the team he played in twenty games and started twelve.

References
Joe Kurth's profile at NFL.com

1907 births
Year of death missing
All-American college football players
American football running backs
American football tackles
Green Bay Packers players
Notre Dame Fighting Irish football players
University of Wisconsin–Madison alumni
Sportspeople from Madison, Wisconsin
Players of American football from Wisconsin